The 2011 Tour de Pologne was the 68th running of the Tour de Pologne cycling stage race. It started on 31 July in Pruszków and finished on 6 August in Kraków. It was the 19th race of the 2011 UCI World Tour season.

Sagan had held the lead prior to Martin, having won the fourth and fifth stages, but lost his advantage after losing time in the closing metres of stage six, after an attack by Martin and Wout Poels, another  rider.

On the final stage, Sagan and Marcato moved closer to Martin at the intermediate sprint – offering time bonuses to the top three riders – by taking second and third behind Martin's team-mate Heinrich Haussler, with the winner of the Tour to be decided at the finish in Kraków. Despite missing out on the stage victory – taken by 's Marcel Kittel, who took his fourth stage victory of the week – Sagan finished just behind in second place, and with a time bonus of six seconds, he overhauled Martin by five seconds. Marcato finished fifth on the stage to seal his third place in the general classification, two seconds behind Martin and seven behind Sagan.

In the race's other classifications,  rider Michał Gołaś won the King of the Mountains classification, Sagan won the points classification, Adrian Kurek of Team Poland BGŻ finished clear at the top of the sprints classification, with  also finishing at the head of the teams classification.

Schedule
Aside from entering the Czech Republic (to the city of Český Těšín on the border with Poland) during the fourth stage, the race stages started and ended in Polish locations.

Teams
The 18 teams from the UCI World Tour were automatically invited to this edition of the Tour de Pologne.

4 teams were also awarded a wildcard place into the event:
 
 
 Team Poland BGŻ

Stages

Stage 1
31 July 2011 – Pruszków to Warsaw,

Stage 2
1 August 2011 – Częstochowa to Dąbrowa Górnicza,

Stage 3
2 August 2011 – Będzin to Katowice,

Stage 4
3 August 2011 – Oświęcim to Cieszyn,

Stage 5
4 August 2011 – Zakopane to Zakopane,

Stage 6
5 August 2011 – Terma Bukowina Tatrzańska to Bukowina Tatrzańska,

Stage 7
6 August 2011 – Kraków to Kraków,

Category leadership table

References

External links

2011 UCI World Tour
2011
2011 in Polish sport
July 2011 sports events in Europe
August 2011 sports events in Europe